Adolphus Frederick IV (5 May 1738 – 2 June 1794) was Duke of Mecklenburg-Strelitz from 1752 to his death in 1794.

Biography
He was born in Mirow to Duke Charles Louis Frederick of Mecklenburg and his wife Princess Elisabeth Albertine of Saxe-Hildburghausen. His father was the second son of Adolphus Frederick II, Duke of Mecklenburg.

He was the heir presumptive of Mecklenburg-Strelitz from the death of his father on 5 June 1752 until he succeeded his uncle Duke Adolphus Frederick III on 11 December 1752. In 1753 he studied at the University of Greifswald. In 1764 Adolphus Frederick was installed as a member of the Order of the Garter.

In the first years after 1753, his mother Princess Elisabeth Albertine of Saxe-Hildburghausen was governing for the only 14-year-old son under the protection of King George II of Great Britain. He never married. Following his death at Neustrelitz in 1794 he was succeeded by his brother Charles.

Ancestry

References

External links

1738 births
1794 deaths
Dukes of Mecklenburg-Strelitz
House of Mecklenburg-Strelitz
Extra Knights Companion of the Garter
People from Mirow
Recipients of the Order of the White Eagle (Poland)